Gary Jerome Coleman (born September 18, 1941) has been a general authority of the Church of Jesus Christ of Latter-day Saints (LDS Church) since 1992.

Coleman was born in Wenatchee, Washington. He was raised a Roman Catholic in the Diocese of Spokane. As a student at Washington State University (WSU), Coleman was introduced to the LDS Church by John M. Madsen and Judith Renee England. At age 21, Coleman was baptized into the LDS Church by Madsen, and then married England.

After graduating from WSU, Coleman went on the receive master's and doctorate degrees from Brigham Young University (BYU).

LDS Church service

Prior to his call as a general authority, Coleman was an instructor in the Church Educational System. At the time of his call as a general authority he was the assistant director of the Institute of Religion in Ogden, Utah, adjacent to Weber State University. Coleman has served in the church as a bishop and as a counselor to both stake and mission presidents. He also served as president of the California Arcadia Mission.

Coleman was called as a general authority and member of the Second Quorum of the Seventy in 1992. He was transferred to the First Quorum of the Seventy in 1997. On October 1, 2011, Coleman was released from the First Quorum of the Seventy and designated as an emeritus general authority at the church's general conference.

In 2012, Coleman was the keynote speaker at Brigham Young University's 41st Annual Sidney B. Sperry Symposium on the Scriptures.

Bibliography
The Journey of Conversion: A Renewed Invitation to Come Unto Christ Gary J. Coleman (Deseret Book Co, September 1, 2003)
Yes, Mormons Are Christians Gary J. Coleman (Legends Library, 2017)

See also 
 List of general authorities of The Church of Jesus Christ of Latter-day Saints
 2008 Deseret Morning News Church Almanac (Salt Lake City, Utah: Deseret Morning News, 2007) p. 43

References

External links 
 General Authorities and General Officers: Elder Gary J. Coleman
 Grampa Bill's G.A. Pages: Gary J. Coleman

1941 births
20th-century Mormon missionaries
American Mormon missionaries in the United States
Brigham Young University alumni
Church Educational System instructors
Converts to Mormonism from Roman Catholicism
Living people
Members of the First Quorum of the Seventy (LDS Church)
Members of the Second Quorum of the Seventy (LDS Church)
Mission presidents (LDS Church)
Washington State University alumni
American general authorities (LDS Church)
People from Wenatchee, Washington
Latter Day Saints from Washington (state)
Latter Day Saints from Utah